H-Store is an experimental database management system (DBMS). It was designed for online transaction processing applications. H-Store was developed by a team at Brown University, Carnegie Mellon University, the Massachusetts Institute of Technology, and Yale University in 2007 by researchers Michael Stonebraker, Sam Madden, Andy Pavlo and Daniel Abadi.

Architecture
H-Store was promoted as a new class of parallel database management systems, called NewSQL, that provide the high-throughput and high-availability of NoSQL systems, but without giving up the transactional consistency of a traditional DBMS known as ACID (atomicity, consistency, isolation and durability). Such systems operate across multiple machines, as opposed to a single, more powerful, more expensive machine.

H-Store is able to execute transaction processing with high throughput by forgoing many features of traditional relational database management systems.

H-Store was designed as a parallel system to run on a cluster of shared-nothing, main memory executor nodes (processor + memory + storage). The database is partitioned into disjoint subsets each assigned to a single-threaded execution engine assigned to one core on one node. Each engine has exclusive access to all of the data in its partition. Because it is single-threaded, only one transaction at a time can access the data stored on that partition. No physical locks or latches are included in the system, and once it is started, no transaction stalls waiting for another transaction to complete. Throughput is increased by increasing the number of nodes in the system and reducing partition sizes.

Licensing
H-Store was licensed under the BSD license and GPL licenses. By 2009, the VoltDB company developed a commercial version, and the H-Store research group shut down in 2016.

See also

 C-Store

References

Data management
Distributed data stores
Free database management systems
NewSQL
Software using the BSD license